The Last Parade is a 1931 American pre-Code crime drama film directed by Erle C. Kenton and starring Jack Holt, Tom Moore and Constance Cummings.

Synopsis
Two World War I veterans return home. One joins the police while the other, failing to get a job as a newspaper reporter, gets mixed up with organized crime.

Cast

References

Bibliography
 Dick, Bernard F. The Merchant Prince of Poverty Row: Harry Cohn of Columbia Pictures. University Press of Kentucky, 2015.

External links
 

1931 films
1931 crime drama films
American crime drama films
Films directed by Erle C. Kenton
Columbia Pictures films
1930s English-language films
1930s American films